MV Renasa is a Dutch river tanker which was involved in an accident on 9 January 2004 which demolished a windmill.

History

Renasa was built by Stocznia Koźle Serwis Sp z o.o., (now Damen Shipyards Koźle) and launched in 1999.

Accident

On 9 January 2004, Renasa was involved in an accident on the Prinses Margrietkanaal that resulted in the De Haensmolen, Grou, Friesland, which stood on the corner of the Pikmeer, being demolished. De Haensmolen has since been repaired and rebuilt in a new position by the Biggemeer.

References

Merchant ships of the Netherlands
Ships built in Poland
1999 ships